Camp Swift is a census-designated place (CDP) in Bastrop County, Texas, United States. The population was 7,943 at the 2020 census. Camp Swift began as a United States Army training base built in 1942. It is named after Major General Eben Swift.

History
The Army signed a $25 million contract in January 1942 to build a training camp on 56,000 acres north of Bastrop, Texas. The contract stipulated the  project was to be completed in 108 working days. 2700 buildings were built during World War II, but none of those remain on the site today. At the end of the war, they were sold or donated and relocated. The gymnasium was relocated to Whitney Texas. It is still in use today by the school district.

During World War II, German prisoners of war began arriving and at peak numbered 10,000.  At the same time, the camp held 90,000 GIs, making it "one of the largest army training and transshipment camps in Texas" according to Krammer.

In December 1942, Sgt Walter Springs was gunned down by a White military police officer following a dispute as Springs was reporting to Camp Swift. Springs was shot in the back, but the case remains largely unsolved to this day. A memorial scholarship in his honor has been active at his alma mater, Regis University, for most of the period since 1952 and has the backing of former NBA All Star Chauncey Billups.

The 10th Mountain Division trained at Camp Swift in 1944. The 2nd Infantry Division trained there mid 1945 to early 1946. The camp also trained nurses under battlefield conditions. The camp trained some 300,000 soldiers before the war ended.

Camp Swift is currently owned by the United States Government but is managed by the Texas Military Forces headquartered on Camp Mabry in Austin and acts as a training center for the National and State Guard, active armed forces, law enforcement, high school ROTC and the Civil Air Patrol. The camp is also the primary emergency staging area for Central Texas.

Civil Air Patrol
The Texas Wing of the Civil Air Patrol, the Auxiliary of the Air Force has held its encampment, a one-week high intensity simulated military training program for Cadet (leaders in training) members in Camp Swift since 2011.

Geography
Texas State Highway 95 forms the western edge of the community, connecting Bastrop to the south with Elgin to the north.

Demographics

As of the 2020 United States census, there were 7,943 people, 1,444 households, and 1,025 families residing in the CDP.

As of the census of 2000, there were 4,731 people, 1,127 households, and 849 families residing in the CDP. The population density was 396.2 people per square mile (153.0/km2). There were 1,231 housing units at an average density of 103.1/sq mi (39.8/km2). The racial makeup of the CDP was 73.28% White, 8.84% African American, 1.16% Native American, 0.25% Asian, 0.06% Pacific Islander, 13.11% from other races, and 3.30% from two or more races. Hispanic or Latino of any race were 37.88% of the population.

There were 1,127 households, out of which 40.1% had children under the age of 18 living with them, 58.2% were married couples living together, 10.9% had a female householder with no husband present, and 24.6% were non-families. 19.3% of all households were made up of individuals, and 4.4% had someone living alone who was 65 years of age or older. The average household size was 2.98 and the average family size was 3.40.

In the CDP, the population was spread out, with 22.6% under the age of 18, 8.9% from 18 to 24, 42.5% from 25 to 44, 21.1% from 45 to 64, and 5.0% who were 65 years of age or older. The median age was 34 years. For every 100 females, there were 185.9 males. For every 100 females age 18 and over, there were 224.0 males.

The median income for a household in the CDP was $41,833, and the median income for a family was $44,352. Males had a median income of $30,572 versus $25,044 for females. The per capita income for the CDP was $12,829. About 9.2% of families and 11.6% of the population were below the poverty line, including 9.6% of those under age 18 and 25.7% of those age 65 or over.

Government and infrastructure
Federal Correctional Institution Bastrop, a prison of the Federal Bureau of Prisons (BOP), is in Camp Swift.

Education
Camp Swift is served by the Bastrop Independent School District. Most residents are zoned to Lost Pines Elementary School, while a small southern section is zoned to Mina Elementary School. All residents are zoned to Bastrop Intermediate School, Bastrop Middle School, and Bastrop High School.

See also

 Texas Military Forces
 Texas Military Department
 List of conflicts involving the Texas Military
 Awards and decorations of the Texas Military
List of World War II prisoner-of-war camps in the United States

References

External links
 

Census-designated places in Bastrop County, Texas
Census-designated places in Texas
Census-designated places in Greater Austin
Texas Military Department
Texas Military Forces